New Garden is an unincorporated community in Hanover Township, Columbiana County, Ohio, United States.

History
New Garden was laid out in 1810. A post office called New Garden was established in 1830, and remained in operation until 1893.

Quaker missionary Stephen Grellet passed through New Garden in 1824, and wrote in Chapter 66 of his memoirs that he was under "great depression of body and mind", mentioning the "powers of anti-Christ" and that many in the New Garden Quaker community "are among those who are carried away by the spirit of infidelity".

An auxiliary of the American Anti-Slavery Society was formed in New Garden in 1834.

In 1848, African-American abolitionist and author Martin Delany traveled through the community to report on the struggles of free blacks, and wrote of the "'respectable and praiseworthy' black farmers of New Garden, Ohio".

Recreation

Notable person
 Robert B. Wood, awarded the Medal of Honor for his actions during the Civil War

References

Unincorporated communities in Ohio
Populated places in Columbiana County, Ohio
1810 establishments in Ohio